Sufficientarianism is one of the several main theories of distributive justice. Sufficientarianism is concerned with a view of justice which emphasis the idea that all should have enough. Frankfurt suggests, when looking at economic distribution, that the morally important thing is that all should have enough not that all would have the same.  Roemer suggests that this might be thought of as maximising the numbers of those who have enough (2004, p. 278).

References

Normative ethics
Political theories